Karobran: The Story of an Aboriginal Girl is an autobiographical novel by Monica Clare, published posthumously in 1978. It was among the first publications by an Aboriginal Australian woman, though it was significantly altered after her death, and in some cases, the alterations changed the meaning of the novel. It has been identified as a work supporting the Communist Party of Australia and minimizing some elements of Clare's own life. The novel was obscure until critical interest was revived in the 1990s.

Publication and contents 
According to Fred Moore, a friend of Monica Clare, until the early 1970s, many Aboriginal Australian writers were not sought after by publishers – "there was no funding" for publishing Aboriginal writing, and "no one took Aboriginal people very serious". Monica Clare, herself an Aboriginal woman, wrote the autobiographical novel Karobran prior to her death in 1973, and Society of Women Writers member Mona Brand edited it. Upon Clare's death, Brand ceased working on the novel because the society considered it distasteful to edit the work of dead writers. Jack Horner, a friend of Clare's, began editing it thereafter for $350. The book was published by Alternative Publishing Co-operative Limited – a newly-formed press for books the major presses did not wish to publish ― in 1978. Faith Bandler wrote the preface. Along with Margaret Tucker's If Everyone Cared (1977), it was one of the first published works by an Aboriginal woman.

Horner significantly edited the text; out of some 6,000 alterations that Horner made, at least half of them changed the meaning of portions of the draft. For example, several references to Aboriginal culture and spiritual life were removed. In the final, published version of the novel, Isabelle, an Aboriginal girl, is taken from her father, raised as a domestic servant by a white family, experiences racial discrimination by her schoolmates, and becomes radicalized by the labour movement.

Reception 
Between 1978 and 1988, only two universities had Karobran as a course material, and over the next ten years, only some fifty copies of the novel were sold. The book was obscure until the 1990s, and critics treated the text as edited haphazardly and for a political agenda. For instance, literary critic Gay Raines identified the novel as being "mediated through 'white' introductions", since the novel had "publishers note, acknowledgments, a foreword, a preface, and an introduction" at once, even though it could stand on its own.

Literary critic Kay Schaffer writes that the novel was written to support the Communist Party of Australia, and that the final scene – an optimistic rally by a group of protesters for expanding rights – "invokes a socialist-realist platform for political action". Schaffer writes that Clare's decision to highlight this theme, but failing to mention her own divorce or child separation, has been noticed by others reading the text – particularly Aboriginal readers.

Notes and references

Notes

Citations

Bibliography

 
 
 
 
 
 
 
 

1978 Australian novels
1978 debut novels
Australian autobiographical novels
Indigenous Australian literature
Stolen Generations